Pages from the Book of Life: Chapter 1 is the second studio album by American R&B/soul singer Joya, released on September 25, 2001 on the independent label Carmel Park Records. All tracks were written and produced by Du Kelly and Joya. The album features her cover version of reggae artist Bob Marley's classic song, "Caution". The album was re-released in 2002 with some tracks altered, and included four new songs; "Seattle", "If", DIRTY", and "Telephone Call".

Track listing

The tracks "Caution" and "When I Drop the News" were not included on the 2002 U.S. reissue CD.

Personnel 
 Joya – Lead vocals, Background vocals
 Dan Evans – Executive producer
 Dupree Kelly – Producer
 Joya Owens – Producer

References

External links
thisisjoyaofficial.com
Joya-Pages from the Book of Life (CD Album)

2001 albums
Joya (singer) albums
Carmel Park Records albums